Revision is a demoparty which takes place on Easter in Saarbrücken, Germany. It is the successor of the Breakpoint party series, and retains many of the organizing staff. The event was established in 2011, after Breakpoint had announced its end in 2010.

The party hosts around 800 people from around the world each year. It is currently the largest pure-demoscene event in the world.

Editions
Revision, like its predecessors, always takes place on Easter weekend; the dates of the event thus follow Computus.
 Revision 2011: April 22–25
 Revision 2012: April 6–9
 Revision 2013: March 29 – April 1
 Revision 2014: April 18–21
 Revision 2015: April 3–6
 Revision 2016: March 25–28
 Revision 2017: April 14–17
 Revision 2018: March 30 – April 2
 Revision 2019: April 19–22
 Revision 2020: April 10–13 — Conference held entirely online due to the COVID-19 pandemic
 Revision 2021: April 2–5 — Conference held entirely online due to the COVID-19 pandemic
 Revision 2022: April 15–18 - Combined Hybrid Event, Live stream from Germany with smaller Satellite events around the world

References

External links
 Revision official website

Demo parties
Annual events in Germany
Recurring events established in 2010
Spring (season) events in Germany